The men's K-2 1000 metres event was a pairs kayaking event conducted as part of the Canoeing at the 1976 Summer Olympics program.

Medalists

Results

Heats
The 24 crews first raced in three heats on July 29. The top three finishers from each of the heats advanced directly to the semifinals. The remaining 15 teams were relegated to the repechage heats.

Borisov is listed as Borisov Konstantinov in the official report.

Repechages
Taking place on July 29, the top three competitors in each of the three repechages advanced to the semifinals.

Semifinals
The top three finishers in each of the three semifinals (raced on July 31) advanced to the final.

Final
The final was held on July 31.

References
1976 Summer Olympics official report Volume 3. p. 181. 
Sports-reference.com 1976 K-2 1000 m results.

Men's K-2 1000
Men's events at the 1976 Summer Olympics